Anton Gogeisl (30 October 1701 – 12 October 1771) was a German Jesuit Missionary.

Biography 
Anton Gogeisl was born in Siegenburg, Bavaria in the Diocese of Regensburg on 30 October 1701.
He was educated as a mathematician,
He became a member of the Society of Jesus in 1720.
In 1737 he left for China. He reached Goa on 5 August 1738 and Beijing on 1 March 1739.

In 1746 Gogeisl  was made vice-president of the Tribunal of Mathematicians and a mandarin (6th class).
Gogeisl followed Ignaz Kögler  (1680–1746) and Augustin von Hallerstein (1703–74) as Assistant Director at the Peking Observatory, and remained in this position for 26 years, He probably designed one of the quadrants in the observatory.
In 1766 he met with the Korean Hong Taeyong (1722–1809) to discuss astronomy and religion.

He died on 12 October 1771 in Beijing. He was buried in the Jesuits' Zhalan Cemetery in Beijing.

References
Citations

Sources

1701 births
1771 deaths
18th-century German Jesuits
German Roman Catholic missionaries
18th-century German astronomers
German expatriates in China
Jesuit missionaries in China